WRTA may refer to:

 WRTA (AM), a radio station (1240 AM) licensed to Altoona, Pennsylvania, United States
 Worcester Regional Transit Authority
 Western Reserve Transit Authority